
Year 475 (CDLXXV) was a common year starting on Wednesday (link will display the full calendar) of the Julian calendar. At the time, it was known as the Year of the Consulship of Zeno without colleague (or, less frequently, year 1228 Ab urbe condita). The denomination 475 for this year has been used since the early medieval period, when the Anno Domini calendar era became the prevalent method in Europe for naming years.

Events 
 By place 

 Roman Empire 
 January 9 – Emperor Zeno abdicates under pressure, as his wife's uncle Basiliscus stages a coup d'état at Constantinople, with support from Zeno's trusted adviser and fellow Isaurian Illus. Basiliscus usurps the throne and is proclaimed new emperor (Augustus) of the Eastern Roman Empire. He begins a 20-month reign; Zeno and his supporters flee to Isauria.
 April 9 – Basiliscus issues a circular letter (Enkyklikon) to the bishops of his empire, promoting the Miaphysite christological position. These religious views will make him highly unpopular.
 Summer – Emperor Julius Nepos grants the Visigoth King Euric legal tenure of his conquests, which include Provence (region of Gaul), in exchange for full independence.
 August 28 – Magister Militum Orestes takes control of the government in Ravenna, and forces Julius Nepos to flee to Dalmatia.
 October 31 – Romulus Augustus is installed as emperor by his father Orestes, who becomes regent in effect of the Western Roman Empire. Augustus will ultimately rule for 10 months, as the last Western Emperor.

 Asia 
 Bodhidharma, Buddhist monk, travels to China and, begins teaching the Laṅkāvatāra Sūtra (approximate date).
 Gongju becomes the capital of Baekje, and is threatened by Goguryeo, who conquers the Han River valley (Korea).
 Munju becomes king of Baekje.

Byzantine Empire
Great fire in Constantinople with loss of Palace of Lausus and - along with it - the famous Zeus from Olympia.

 By topic 
 Art 
 A Bodhisattva (detail of a wall painting in the Ajanta Caves) in Maharashtra (India) of the Gupta period) is made (approximate date).

 Religion 
 The compilation of the Babylonian Talmud, the source of the majority of Jewish Halakha, is completed.
 The Church of Saint Simeon Stylites is consecrated in Syria.

Births 
 Íte of Killeedy, Irish nun (approximate date)
 Ferreolus of Rodez, Roman senator (approximate date)

Deaths 
 May 27 – Eutropius, bishop of Orange
 Flavius Magnus, Roman consul
 Gaero, king of Baekje (Korea)
 Mamertus, bishop of Vienne
 Tonantius Ferreolus, praetorian prefect

References